In probability theory and statistics, a standardized moment of a probability distribution is a moment (often a higher degree central moment) that is normalized, typically by a power of the standard deviation, rendering the moment scale invariant. The shape of different probability distributions can be compared using standardized moments.

Standard normalization 
Let X be a random variable with a probability distribution P and mean value  (i.e. the first raw moment or moment about zero), the operator E denoting the expected value of X. Then the standardized moment of degree k is  that is, the ratio of the kth moment about the mean

to the kth power of the standard deviation,

The power of k is because moments scale as  meaning that  they are homogeneous functions of degree k, thus the standardized moment is scale invariant. This can also be understood as being because moments have dimension; in the above ratio defining standardized moments, the dimensions cancel, so they are dimensionless numbers.

The first four standardized moments can be written as:

For skewness and kurtosis, alternative definitions exist, which are based on the third and fourth cumulant respectively.

Other normalizations 

Another scale invariant, dimensionless measure for characteristics of a distribution is the coefficient of variation, . However, this is not a standardized moment, firstly because it is a reciprocal, and secondly because  is the first moment about zero (the mean), not the first moment about the mean (which is zero).

See Normalization (statistics) for further normalizing ratios.

See also 
Coefficient of variation
Moment (mathematics)
Central moment

References 

Statistical deviation and dispersion
Statistical ratios
Moment (mathematics)